Symmetrischema elementare is a moth in the family Gelechiidae. It was described by Povolný in 1989. It is found in Argentina.

References

Symmetrischema
Moths described in 1989
Taxa named by Dalibor Povolný